An Act against Plowing by the Tayle, and pulling the Wooll off living Sheep (10 & 11 Chas. 1 c. 15) was an Act of the Parliament of Ireland passed in 1635. It was one of the first pieces of legislation to protect the rights of animals. The act was one of several proposed to deal with what the Protestant Ascendancy viewed as the barbarous practices of the Gaelic Irish. The committee for preparing Acts (under Poynings' Law) on 26 July 1634 ordered the Attorney General and Solicitor-General to "make a draught of one or more Acts to be passed for restraining the barbaric custom of plowing by the tail, of pulling the wool off living sheep, of burning corn in the straw, of barking of standing trees, of cutting young trees by stealth, of forcing cows to give milk, and of building houses without chimneys". One other act arose from this order: "An Act to Prevent the unprofitable Custom of Burning of Corne in the Straw" (10 & 11 Chas. 1 c.17).

Ploughing by the tail
Especially in Ulster, the practice was to attach a short plough to a horse's tail. The simple plough was cheaper than one attached with a harness. The horse would stop in pain when the plough hit a rock, which made rocks less likely to damage the plough. In 1606, an order in council prohibited the practice, with a fine of a garron.  (The order was by royal prerogative: an "act of state" rather than an "act of parliament".) The order was not enforced, and in 1612 Arthur Chichester, the Lord Deputy, mandated instead a fine of 10 shillings, selling a monopoly patent for £100 per year to Sir William Udale to collect the fines. Udale earned £870 the first year. Administrators complained that Udale was charging only 2s6d, so that the fine served as a fee rather than a deterrent. In 1614 the Dublin Castle administration suggested the fines should be used to pay for better ploughs, or replaced with corporal punishment. Nevertheless Udale's patent was renewed in 1623. Several petitioners from Ulster asked for the order's revocation.

Pulling of wool

Enforcement and repeal
A bill to suspend the 1635 act for ten years was transmitted and approved by Charles I in 1641, but never enacted as the 1641 Rebellion began a period of disruption. The 1635 act's repeal was demanded in 1646 by the Confederates in negotiations with Lord Deputy Ormonde. It was finally repealed in 1828 by one of Peel's Acts for restating and consolidating laws (9 Geo. 4 c. 53). British Whig writers of the 1830s alleged that ploughing by the tail was still practised in the West of Ireland at that time. Such claims were denied by Irish nationalists as propaganda.

References

Sources
Primary
 
 
 Report of Commissioners: Patent Roll, 16 James I. part iii. f.; reprinted in 

Secondary

Citations

Further reading
 
 

Acts of the Parliament of Ireland (pre-1801)
1635 in law
1635 in Ireland
Animal welfare and rights legislation
Agriculture in Ireland